2012 French elections may refer to:
 2012 French presidential election
 2012 French legislative election